Stela Perin (born 6 May 1934 in Arad, Romania) is a Romanian former artistic gymnast. She competed at the 1952 Summer Olympics.

References

External links

1934 births
Living people
Romanian female artistic gymnasts
Gymnasts at the 1952 Summer Olympics
Olympic gymnasts of Romania
Sportspeople from Arad, Romania
20th-century Romanian women